Ezra Yaghoub Synagogue is one of oldest synagogues in Tehran, located in the Oudlajan neighborhood. The synagogue was created in the 19th century AD during the reign of Naser al-Din Shah Qajar and has been repaired and restored many times since then. Ezra Yaghoub, for whom the synagogue is named, was a prominent Iranian Jewish merchant and was the first person to make business contact with the city of Manchester in England. After passing at forty, his widow spent most of his fortune on charity for the Iranian Jews. The building has been placed on the list of historic buildings in the Cultural Heritage, Handcrafts and Tourism Organization since 1383 SH (2004–2005  AD).

References 

Synagogues in Tehran
Buildings and structures in Tehran
Orthodox synagogues
Orthodox Judaism in the Middle East
Buildings of the Qajar period
Synagogues completed in 1894